Zekerijah Đezić (14 November 1937 – 17 October 2002) was a Bosnian folk singer. In 1964, Đezić became the first citizen of Tuzla to have their voice recorded on a gramophone record with the release of his first song "Tuzlanka se Sarajkama hvali" (The Tuzla Girl Brags to the Sarajevo Girls). He was posthumously awarded the Davorin award in 2003.

Early life
Đezić was born into a Bosniak family in Janja, near Bijeljina, Bosnia and Herzegovina. His mother Hanifa died in February 1965.

Career
Before striking a record deal with Jugoton, Zekerijah worked as a hotel singer in Tuzla, Bijeljina and Zagreb. He relocated to Sarajevo in 1959, singing in hotels for a few months before moving back to Tuzla in March 1960 and signing with Radio Tuzla.

He retired on 25 April 1996.

Death
Zekerijah Đezić died on 17 October 2002 after a prolonged illness. He is buried at the Alifakovac cemetery in Sarajevo.

Discography

Studio albums
Dođi, pjesmo moja (1974)

EP's and singles
Razbole se care Sulejmane (1964)
Razbolje se šimšir list (1966) with Narodni Orkestar Žarka Milanovića
Splavar sa Drine (1967)
Među nama svršeno je sve (1968)
Vojnička pesma (1969)
Ne plači jedina / Banja Luka (1970) with Ansambl Spase Beraka
Nemoj nikad reći zbogom (1970)
Puknite strune (1971)
Od Sarajki ljepših žena nema (1972)
Volimo se svi (1972)
Dođi pjesmo moja (1973)
Druže stari (1973)

External links
Zekerijah Đezić discography at Discogs

References

1937 births
2002 deaths
People from Janja
Bosniaks of Bosnia and Herzegovina
Sevdalinka
Yugoslav male singers